My Best Girl is a 1927 film with Mary Pickford and Buddy Rogers.

My Best Girl may also refer to:
 My Best Girl (musical), a 1912 Broadway musical co-composed by W. Augustus Barratt
 My Best Girl (1915 film), a film with Lois Meredith
 My Best Girl (1925 film) , a film with Larry Semon